WFMS (95.5 MHz) is a commercial country music FM radio station. It is owned by Cumulus Media and is licensed to Fishers, Indiana, while serving the Indianapolis metropolitan area. Its studios and offices are located on North Shadeland Avenue east of Indianapolis, and its transmitter is off Burk Road. The station has won several awards from the Country Music Association as large market station of the year.

WFMS is licensed to broadcast in the hybrid HD Radio format.

History
WFMS first signed on the air on March 15, 1957, and originally it was licensed to Indianapolis.  It became a country music station in October 1976, and has stayed in the same format since then.

References

External links

FMS
Country radio stations in the United States
1957 establishments in Indiana
Cumulus Media radio stations
Mass media in Indianapolis
Radio stations established in 1957